Itheum is a genus of longhorn beetles of the subfamily Lamiinae, containing the following species:

 Itheum alboscutellare Breuning, 1940
 Itheum fuscoantennale Breuning, 1943
 Itheum lineare Pascoe, 1864
 Itheum robustum Oke, 1932
 Itheum villosum Oke, 1932
 Itheum vittigerum Pascoe, 1864

References

Lamiinae